Narang , or Narang Mandi, is a city located in the Muridke Tehsil of Sheikhupura District, Punjab, Pakistan. The city is approximately 8 kilometres away from the India-Pakistan border.

References

Populated places in Sheikhupura District